Doctor Erasmus Darwin French (1822–1902)  was an American man of adventure. He was born New York State, trained as a doctor and then enlisted in the army, later becoming a silver prospector. He married Miss Cornelia S. Cowles, daughter of Judge Cowles of San Diego in 1858. They had two sons Alfred and Addison.

Early years
Dr. French was born in Middlesex, New York on January 20, 1822. He was the son of Harvey and Amanda Hazelton French. His father was a veteran of the War of 1812. He attended local schools before moving to Michigan where he attended Albion Seminary. While in Hillsdale County he studied medicine and practiced as a doctor for some years. In 1845 he went to Fort Leavenworth, Kansas where he enlisted in the US Army at the start of the Mexican American War and entered the service as a private even though he was a practicing physician in civilian life.

Middle years

Dr. French's goal was to make his fortune in the world, and he set out to do that in December 1845.  His plans were interrupted by the Mexican-American War, in which he served. After he was discharged in early 1847, he resumed his quest for adventure, purchased a large ranch northeast of Los Angeles in the late 1840s, assisted some lost settlers who had mistakenly wandered through California's Death Valley, and opened a mining town in south central California. The residents of that town named the village after Dr. French — they called it Darwin, California. The town is still in existence as of 2017.  Dr. French had heard that there was a possible silver lode in the midst of Death Valley. Despite that it was largely unexplored, Dr. French led an expedition into the valley in 1850 but found no silver. In 1860, Darwin led another party into Death Valley in a second attempt to find silver, again without success. The route he took can still be observed in Death Valley National Park. Two other landmarks are named after him, Darwin Falls and Darwin Wash.

The 1846 journey of General Stephen Kearny and his Army of the West across the wilderness of the southwestern United States has been the subject of many books and articles. Dr. French was on that march and captured a vivid account of the Battle of San Pasqual, in which he fought.

The Battle of San Pasqual, December 6, 1846
Dictation from Poway, California by Dr. E.D. French, July 7, 1887

Legacy
French died in September 1902 in Ensenada. The Darwin Creek and its Darwin Falls, the Darwin Falls Wilderness, the nearby town of Darwin, California, and all other areas named "Darwin" on the western edge of Death Valley National Park are named after him.

References

Sources
The above quoted account was written in Dr. French's hometown of Poway, California, a small town located north of San Diego. In 1887, Dr. French was asked to provide his own eyewitness account of the final decisive battle for the future state of California in the Mexican–American War of 1846. Dr. French was a participant in that battle, the Battle of San Pasqual.

This account is a typewritten copy of a microfilm of the original dictation on file in the Bancroft Library at the University of California at Berkeley. The original dictation was done by hand but there is no way to determine whether or not it was written by Dr. French or written by a clerk to whom he delivered the dictation. The typewritten copy is as near as possible an exact representation of the original manuscript including the original spelling and punctuation.

1822 births
1902 deaths
American male poets
American pioneers
People from New York (state)